The finals and the qualifying heats of the men's 200 metre butterfly event at the 1998 World Aquatics Championships were held on Wednesday 1998-01-14 in Perth, Western Australia.

A Final

B Final

Qualifying heats

See also
1996 Men's Olympic Games 200m Butterfly (Atlanta)
1997 Men's World SC Championships 200m Butterfly (Gothenburg)
1997 Men's European LC Championships 200m Butterfly (Seville)
2000 Men's Olympic Games 200m Butterfly (Sydney)

References

Swimming at the 1998 World Aquatics Championships